Sarıbulaq (also, Şarıbulaq, Sarybulak, Sarybulakhbina, and Sarykhbulakhbina)is a village and municipality in the Balakan Rayon of Azerbaijan.  It has a population of 1,543.  The municipality consists of the villages of Sarıbulaq, Ağkilsə, and Kilsəbuqov.

References 

Populated places in Balakan District